Hertford and Stevenage was a parliamentary constituency in Hertfordshire, which returned one Member of Parliament (MP)  to the House of Commons of the Parliament of the United Kingdom from February 1974 until it was abolished for the 1983 general election.

Boundaries
The Municipal Borough of Hertford, the Urban Districts of Stevenage and Ware, and the Rural District of Hertford.

Hertford and its rural district had previously been in the Hertford constituency, Stevenage in Hitchin and Ware in Hertfordshire East. After being used for only three general elections, a further round of boundary changes in 1983 saw Hertford and Stevenage abolished, with Hertford and Ware joining Bishop's Stortford in Hertford and Stortford while the remainder of the seat formed the basis of the new Stevenage constituency.

Members of Parliament

Elections

References

 Robert Waller, The Almanac of British Politics (1st edition, London: Croom Helm, 1983)
 Frederic A Youngs, jr, Guide to the Local Administrative Units of England, Vol I (London: Royal Historical Society, 1979)

Parliamentary constituencies in Hertfordshire (historic)
Constituencies of the Parliament of the United Kingdom established in 1974
Constituencies of the Parliament of the United Kingdom disestablished in 1983
Hertford
Stevenage